Indian Ocean Territory may refer to one of three administrative units in the Indian Ocean:

 Australian Indian Ocean Territories (AIOT), two island groups under Australian sovereignty.
 Christmas Island
 Cocos (Keeling) Islands
 British Indian Ocean Territory (BIOT), an overseas territory of the United Kingdom.

See also 
 Indian Territory, a historical territory in the United States of America
 States and union territories of India